The South Alabama Jaguars men's basketball statistical leaders are individual statistical leaders of the South Alabama Jaguars men's basketball program in various categories, including points, assists, blocks, rebounds, and steals. Within those areas, the lists identify single-game, single-season, and career leaders. The Jaguars represent the University of South Alabama in the NCAA's Sun Belt Conference.

South Alabama began competing in intercollegiate basketball in 1968.  The NCAA did not officially record assists as a stat until the 1983–84 season, and blocks and steals until the 1985–86 season, but South Alabama's record books includes players in these stats before these seasons. These lists are updated through the end of the 2020–21 season.

Scoring

Rebounds

Assists

Steals

Blocks

References

Lists of college basketball statistical leaders by team
Statistical